Yo soy Franky is a Colombian telenovela produced TeleVideo for Nickelodeon Latin America. Written by Argentine author Marcela Citterrio, the show follows the story of a teen-robot named Franky (María Gabriela de Faría), who has been designed as if it was a real girl.

In 2017, Nickelodeon adapted the series for its global audience and uses the translated title and slight name change to its titular character, I Am Frankie. The first episode aired September 11, 2017. The adapted series stars Alex Hook as Frankie.

Series overview

Synopsis

Season 1 (2015) 
Sofia Andrade (Paula Barreto) is a great scientist who works in robotics, is married, and has a daughter named Clara Andrade (María José Pescador). Her husband, Wilson Andrade (Jorge López), is a writer of self-help books. For years, Sofia Andrade has been working on a new robot, a model Fra4k4 called later known as Franky Andrade (María Gabriela de Faría). Franky is the biggest project of EGG Enterprises. When the project finally ended, Franky was ready, so Sofia Andrade sent her to school to live side by side with humans.

Now, Franky will face all problems and most importantly, protect her secret from all. However, the most intelligent girl, Tamara Franco (Danielle Arciniegas), will not rest until she discovers Franky's great secret. With her friends, Franky will face all her problems and adapt to a world between humans. Clara Andrade is a very naughty and tender girl; Sofía Andrade is caring and a great scientist; Wilson Andrade is a great crazy lover of books; and Franky is a robot with a human body, very intelligent, harmless and ready to help others.

Miss Tamara Franco was always in love with Christian Montero Léon (Martín Barba), but Christian is in love with Franky, although he does not know her real secret. Paul Mejía (George Slebi) is a dull but goodhearted scientist who soon ends up proving that he can be good, likes copying the ideas of Sofia and believes that bad luck haunts him everywhere. Yo Soy Franky is a story of comedy with a touch of romance and suspense with many lessons, to show viewers that they should not criticize people and will always find someone "weird" who will make them laugh.

Season 2 (2016) 
Franky is now half-human, half-robot, thanks to her new heart. She faces new emotions, new enemies, new adventures... and realizes that coexistence between androids and humans is more complicated than everyone thought. Meanwhile, Sofia poses as Sabrina, the new nanny, thanks to the experiment C4MB10 (Change), which is a robotic case.

There is also the Anti-Robot League, led by Segundo Mejía, Paul's twin brother. Tamara finds out Franky is a robot and threatens to tell Segundo about it to destroy her. Franky will be in trouble, because Segundo is the new principal of Franky's school.

Roby Mejía will also become a superhero, with the help of his parents. But he must be careful, as the girls are trying to find out who hides behind the mask of Andromax.

Season 2 Part 2 (2016) 
After Kassandra leaves the town with Franky's memories, there's a mysterious girl who has a lot of secrets. She has a mission in the year 2016 but in reality, she belongs in the future, in 2035. She attempts to make Cristian and Franky break up forever so humans and robots will never have peace with each other. However, then she starts discovering things about her true creator and her origin. The premiere of the second part of this season premiered on 24 October 2016. Yo Soy Frankys finale was on 16 December 2016 with a total of 160 episodes in all seasons.

After this, on 13 March 2017 Nickelodeon premiered a new series called Heidi, Bienvenida a Casa, from the same writer, Marcela Citterio. Also, the adapted version of Yo Soy Franky (called I Am Franky) premiered in the US on 11 September 2017.

Cast

Main 
 María Gabriela de Faría as Franky Andrade
 Martín Barba as Christian Montero Léon
 Eduardo Pérez as Roby Mejía Léon
Danielle Arciniegas Martinez as Tamara Franco
 Luis Duarte as Iván Villamil
 Kristal as Loli Rivas
 Alejandra Chamorro as Delfina Montero Léon
 Emmanuel Restrepo as Mariano Puentes
 María José Pescador as Clara Andrade
 Brandon Figueredo as Benjamín Franco
 Viviana Santos as Doce Mejía
 Andrés Mercado as Andrés Mejía

Recurring (secondary roles) 
 Paula Barreto as Sofía
 George Slebi as Paul/Segundo Mejía
 Jorge López as Wilson Andrade
 Isabella Castillo as Luz Andrade
 Jimena Durán as Margarita León
 José Manuel Ospina as Ramón Puentes
 Quique SanMartin as Quique
Juan Pablo Obregón as Benito Franco

Episodes

Season 1 (2015)

Season 2 (2016)

References

External links 

Colombian telenovelas
Spanish-language telenovelas
2015 Colombian television series debuts
Nickelodeon telenovelas
Teen telenovelas
2015 telenovelas
2016 telenovelas
Androids in television
Television series about robots
Television series about teenagers
Spanish-language Nickelodeon original programming